Wilson Council may be:

Woodrow Wilson International Center for Scholars
Wilson Council (North Carolina)